Waiharara is a community at the base of the Aupouri Peninsula in Northland, New Zealand. State Highway 1 runs through the community. To the west is Aupouri Forest, and beyond that Ninety Mile Beach. To the east is Rangaunu Harbour. Houhora is 22 km north west, and Awanui is 16 km south east. Lake Waiparera, 35 metres (115 feet) above sea level, is immediately to the north west.

Te Marae o Wharemaru is the meeting place of the hapu Wharemaru who reside and descend from the lands in and around the now known area Kaimaumau. Wharemaru is the name of the Rangatira/Chief of this area. Kaimaumau is the youngest brother of Wharemaru and Rangaunu also the name of the harbour is the eldest sister of Kaimaumau and Wharemaru.

Demographics
The SA1 area is part of the larger Rangaunu Harbour statistical area.

The SA1 statistical area had a population of 243 at the 2018 New Zealand census, an increase of 15 people (6.6%) since the 2013 census, and an increase of 36 people (17.4%) since the 2006 census. There were 96 households, comprising 120 males and 120 females, giving a sex ratio of 1.0 males per female. The median age was 41.6 years (compared with 37.4 years nationally), with 57 people (23.5%) aged under 15 years, 30 (12.3%) aged 15 to 29, 102 (42.0%) aged 30 to 64, and 51 (21.0%) aged 65 or older.

Ethnicities were 79.0% European/Pākehā, 48.1% Māori, 3.7% Pacific peoples, and 3.7% other ethnicities. People may identify with more than one ethnicity.

Of those people who chose to answer the census's question about religious affiliation, 42.0% had no religion, 44.4% were Christian, 1.2% were Buddhist and 4.9% had Māori religious beliefs.

Of those at least 15 years old, 18 (9.7%) people had a bachelor or higher degree, and 45 (24.2%) people had no formal qualifications. The median income was $24,400, compared with $31,800 nationally. 18 people (9.7%) earned over $70,000 compared to 17.2% nationally. The employment status of those at least 15 was that 93 (50.0%) people were employed full-time, 30 (16.1%) were part-time, and 6 (3.2%) were unemployed.

Education

Notes

Far North District
Populated places in the Northland Region